Ryan James Richefond (born 16 June 1996) is an English footballer who plays as a midfielder and coaches football in the Academy at  Leyton Orient, a position he has held since June 2019.

Playing career
Richefond signed a one-year professional contract at Crawley Town in April 2014 after captaining the youth team. He made his debut for the "Reds" on 2 September 2014, coming on for Matt Harrold 71 minutes into a 2–0 win over Cambridge United in a Football League Trophy First Round match at Broadfield Stadium.

Richefond later joined Isthmian League Premier Division side Leatherhead on a one-month loan in February.

On 1 July, Richefond was released from Crawley Town. After leaving Crawley, Richefond signed a contract with Loxwood to join up with former youth team manager Mark Beard. After being a regular in the team he attracted attention from Worthing for whom Richefond later signed a dual contract with.

In March 2016, Richefond left Worthing to sign for Grays Athletic making his debut the following day. The following season, 2016–17, Richefond rejoined Grays in November.

In November 2016, Richefond signed for National League South team Margate. Towards the end of the season he signed for Bishops Stortford where he remained for the start of the 2017–18 season.

After a spell with Ashford United, Richefond joined Leatherhead ahead of the 2018–19 campaign.

In March 2020, Richefond joined Staines Town. He made two appearances for the club in the same month. In September 2020, he moved to Cambridge City. One month later, Richefond signed for Maidstone United.

In July and October 2021, Richenfond played a few friendly games for his former club Worthing.

In October 2021 Richefond had spells with Brentwood Town and Barking, moving to the latter in March 2022.

Career statistics 

t

References

External links
 
 
 Ryan Richefond at Footballdatabase

1996 births
Living people
Footballers from the London Borough of Tower Hamlets
English footballers
Black British sportspeople
Association football midfielders
Crawley Town F.C. players
Loxwood F.C. players
Worthing F.C. players
Grays Athletic F.C. players
Margate F.C. players
Ashford United F.C. players
Leatherhead F.C. players
South Park F.C. players
Hornchurch F.C. players
Staines Town F.C. players
Cambridge City F.C. players
Maidstone United F.C. players
Brentwood Town F.C. players
Barking F.C. players
F.C. Romania players
English Football League players
Isthmian League players